García Álvarez de Toledo y Carrillo de Toledo, 1st Duke of Alba de Tormes ( – 20 June 1488) was a Spanish nobleman, military leader and politician, whose family had presided over the lands of Alba de Tormes since the year 1369.

Biography 
He was the son of Fernando Álvarez de Toledo, 1st Count of Alba de Tormes and of Mencía Carrillo de Toledo, Lady of Bercimuelle

In 1470 The title of duke was granted to Garcia Alvarez de Toledo. In 1472, King Henry IV of Castile elevated the County of Alba de Tormes into a hereditary Duchy.  

The first Duke of Alba fought in the War of the Castilian Succession on the side of the future Queen Isabella I of Castille against her niece, Juana la Beltraneja.

Marriage and issue 
In 1448, he married María Enríquez de Quiñones, daughter of Fadrique Enríquez, Admiral of Castile, with whom he had 5 sons and 4 daughters. A granddaughter, María de Toledo y Rojas, married Diego Colón, son of Christopher Columbus.

They had the following children:
 Fadrique Álvarez de Toledo, 2nd Duke of Alba (1460–1531)
 Mencia de Toledo, married Beltrán de la Cueva, 1st Duke of Alburquerque
 Teresa de Toledo, married Pedro Fernández Manrique, 2nd Count de Osorno
 Francisca de Toledo, married Francisco Fernández de la Cueva, 2nd Duke of Alburquerque
 María de Toledo, married Gómez Suárez de Figueroa, 2nd Count of Feria
 Gutierre Álvarez de Toledo, Bishop of Plasencia
 García Álvarez de Toledo, 1st Lord of la Orcaiada
 Pedro de Toledo, 1st Lord of Mancera
 Fernando de Toledo, 1st Lord of las Villorias

Ancestry

See also 
House of Alba
Henry IV of Castile
Joanna La Beltraneja
Isabella I of Castile
Alfonso of Castile, Prince of Asturias
War of the Castilian Succession

References

Bibliography 

 
 

1420s births
1488 deaths
Garcia 01
Garcia 01
Garcia 01